The Down Syndrome Act 2022 is an Act of Parliament introduced as a private member's bill and sponsored by Conservative MP Liam Fox. It was described as "world leading" by MP Ian Paisley Jr and is intended to make legal provisions for people living with Down syndrome. It was introduced by Baroness Hollins in the House of Lords.

Background 
In the United Kingdom, it is estimated that there are 40,000 people living with the condition.

The bill will recognise people with Downs syndrome as a specific minority group, and ensure their specific social care needs are met. If passed it would be a world first.

Support 
The bill is supported by the Conservative Disability Group, Down's Syndrome Policy Group and actor Tommy Jessop.

The bill had the following cross-party co-sponsors in the House of Commons: Ben Lake, Ian Paisley, Lisa Cameron, Mark Logan, Nick Fletcher, Layla Moran, Darren Jones, James Daly, Flick Drummond and Elliot Colburn.

Passage 
On 26 November 2021, it was debated at Second Reading. On 22 March 2022, an event was held at Parliament to celebrate the government announcing their support for the bill.

External links 

 At the Parliament of the United Kingdom website:

References 

Social care in England
Down syndrome
Children's rights in the United Kingdom
United Kingdom Acts of Parliament 2022
2022 in British law